Sanniquellie-Mah District is one of 17 districts of Nimba County, Liberia. As of 2008, the population was 25,370. Its capital lies at Sanniquellie.

References

 

Districts of Liberia
Nimba County